Jeris McIntyre (born July 4, 1981 in Tampa, Florida) is a former American football wide receiver who was selected by the Kansas City Chiefs in the 6th round of the 2004 NFL Draft. McIntyre played college football for the Auburn Tigers from 2000 to 2003, and led the team with 41 receptions for 621 yards in 2003. On July 19, 2004, McIntyre signed a three-year contract with Kansas City. Jeris also played in NFL Europe where he made the ALL-Europe team after leading the league in yards per catch. He also played for the Bergamo Lions in the Italian Football League.

Coming out of Tampa Catholic High School, Jeris McIntyre was a sports star in both, football and baseball. After his stellar high school career he was recruited to play both sports by colleges all over the country. In 1999 Jeris signed to play football at Auburn University. While attending Auburn, Jeris was a 4-year Letterman and a three-year starter at Wide Receiver. During his senior year in 2003, he was Auburn's Offensive Captain as well as the leading Wide Receiver and go-to target for quarterback Jason Campbell (2005 1st round pick, Washington Redskins). After a good career at Auburn, Jeris was drafted by the Kansas City Chiefs in the 2004 NFL Draft. During the three seasons Jeris was in the Kansas City Chiefs organization, he played for legendary coach Dick Vermil. In the spring of 2005 Jeris played in NFL Europe and was one of the leaders in yards per catch as well as being the Rhein Fires top Wide Receiver. Jeris also had stints with the Toronto Agros of the CFL and the Dallas Desperados of the AFL.

External links
Just Sports Stats
ESPN Player Profile
Kansas City Chiefs player page
Toronto Argonauts player page

References

1981 births
Living people
People from Crawford County, Wisconsin
Players of American football from Wisconsin
American football wide receivers
Auburn Tigers football players
Kansas City Chiefs players
Rhein Fire players
American expatriate sportspeople in Italy
American expatriate players of American football